Sigrun Slapgard (born 20 October 1953) is a Norwegian journalist and non-fiction writer.

Slapgard was born in Hemsedal, and graduated as cand.mag. from the University of Oslo in 1980. She has worked as journalist for NRK from 1988. Her 2002 book Krigens penn, a biography on war reporter Lise Lindbæk, earned her the Melsom Prize. In 2003 she wrote the book Krig og løgn. She wrote a biography on Sigrid Undset in 2007.

References

1953 births
Living people
People from Hemsedal
Norwegian journalists
NRK people
Norwegian non-fiction writers
Norwegian women non-fiction writers
Norwegian biographers
University of Oslo alumni